Itha Ivide Vare is a 1977 Indian Malayalam film, directed by I. V. Sasi and produced by Hari Pothan. The film stars Madhu, M. G. Soman , Sharada, Jayabharathi, and Jayan in the lead roles. After the huge success of this film, M. G. Soman achieved Stardom status. This is the first commercial successful script of P. Padmarajan. The film had musical score by G. Devarajan.

Cast

Madhu as Tharavukaran Pail
M. G. Soman as Vishwanathan 
K. P. Ummer as Vasu, Vishwanathan's father
Sharada as Janu (Ammini nis Mother)
Jayabharathi as Ammini
Vidhubala as Thankhamani
Kaviyoor Ponnamma as Kamalakshi
Adoor Bhasi as Nanu
Sankaradi as Shivaraman Nair
Sreelatha Namboothiri as Shankari
 Raghuraj as Young Vishwanathan
Bahadoor as Vakkachan
KPAC Sunny as Thug
Meena as Janu's Mother
Jayan as Boatman (Cameo Appearance)

Soundtrack
The music was composed by G. Devarajan and the lyrics were written by Yusufali Kechery.

6 "Vennayo vennilavuranjatho" Yesudas

Awards
Filmfare Award for Best Film - Malayalam won by Hari Pothan

References

External links
 

1977 films
1970s Malayalam-language films
Films directed by I. V. Sasi
Films with screenplays by Padmarajan